Al-Mu'ayyad Shihab al-Din Ahmad (1430 – 28 January 1488) was the son of Sayf ad-Din Inal, and a Mamluk sultan of Egypt from 26 February to 28 June 1461.

Biography
Shihab al-Din Ahmad was born in Cairo to Sayf ad-Din Inal and Khawand Zaynab bint Khasbek. He was emir al-hajj ("commander of the pilgrimage [to Mecca]"), before he was proclaimed sultan on 26 February 1461, after his father became ill.

However, Ahmad ruled for four months before peacefully abdicating on 28 June as a result of pressure from an alliance of powerful mamluk factions opposed to his leadership, including the Zahiris, Ashrafis, Nasiris and his own Mu'ayyadis. They were led by Sayf ad-Din Khushqadam who became sultan in Ahmad's stead. Ahmad was imprisoned along with his brother Al-Nasri Mohammed in Alexandria, until he was released during the reign of Timurbugha in 1467.

He was allowed to return to Cairo with his son Ali by Sultan Qaitbay, when his mother became ill in 1479. He later returned to Alexandria and lived there until his death on 28 January 1488.

His only known wife was the daughter of Süleyman Bey, ruler of the Dulkadirid. She had been previously married to Sultan Sayf ad-Din Jaqmaq. She died on 27 April 1460.

References

Sources

Burji sultans
15th-century Mamluk sultans
1430 births
1488 deaths